Ivan Kučírek (25 November 1946 – 5 February 2022) was a Czech cyclist. He competed at the 1964, 1968 and 1972 Summer Olympics. His sporting career began with TJ Favorit Brno.

Kučírek died in Břeclav on 5 February 2022, at the age of 75.

References

External links
 

1946 births
2022 deaths
Czech male cyclists
Olympic cyclists of Czechoslovakia
Cyclists at the 1964 Summer Olympics
Cyclists at the 1968 Summer Olympics
Cyclists at the 1972 Summer Olympics
People from Břeclav
Sportspeople from the South Moravian Region